The 27th Annual Australian Recording Industry Association Music Awards (generally known as ARIA Music Awards or simply The ARIAs) were a series of award ceremonies which included the 2013 ARIA Artisan Awards, ARIA Hall of Fame Awards, ARIA Fine Arts Awards and ARIA Awards. The latter ceremony occurred on 1 December at the Star Event Centre, and was telecast on Nine Network's channel Go! at 7:30pm.

The final nominees for ARIA Award categories were announced on 14 October as well as nominees and winners for Fine Arts Awards and Artisan Awards. Public votes were used for the categories, "Song of the Year", "Best Australian Live Act", "Best International Artist" and "Best Video".

Also on 1 December ARIA inducted Air Supply into their Hall of Fame; ARIA also created a new award category, ARIA Industry Icon, which was awarded to promoter and record label owner, Michael Gudinski.

Performers

The following artists performed at the ARIA Music Awards.
Flume
Tame Impala
Birds of Tokyo
Vance Joy
Bliss n Eso
Jessica Mauboy
Samantha Jade
Sheppard
The Potbelleez
Stafford Brothers
Alison Wonderland
Alicia Keys
Lorde

ARIA Hall of Fame Inductee

Air Supply – Upon the announcement of the group's induction into ARIA Hall of Fame, Russell Hitchcock, one of the two founders with Graham Russell, declared "[i]t is a great honour for us, and it was something that was totally unexpected". The pair were due to return to Australia for the ceremony and "have fun with everybody and we want to say thank you to all who participated in our ARIA Hall of Fame induction".

Nominees and winners

ARIA Awards
Winners are listed first and highlighted in boldface; other final nominees are listed alphabetically by artists' first name.

Fine Arts Awards
Winners are listed first and highlighted in boldface.

Artisan Awards 
Winners are listed first and highlighted in boldface.

See also 
Music of Australia

Notes

References

External links 

2013 in Australian music
2013 music awards
ARIA Music Awards